Verbatim, Flesh and Blood is a live album by Bob Ostertag, released in 1998 by Rastascan Records.

Reception

François Couture of AllMusic gave the album four out of five possible stars, saying "quiet passages abound, textures are more refined, dynamics wider, and the whole thing is more pensive and introspective, without being self-absorbed." Couture concluded by saying "this whole project will go down in history as one of the most original artistic propositions of the 1990s."

Track listing

Personnel
Adapted from the Verbatim, Flesh and Blood liner notes.

Musicians
 Bob Ostertag – sampler

Additional musicians
 Mark Dresser – contrabass
 Phil Minton – voice
 Gerry Hemingway – percussion

Production and design
 D-L Alvarez – cover art, design

Release history

References

External links 
 Verbatim, Flesh and Blood at Bandcamp
 

1998 live albums
Bob Ostertag albums
Seeland Records live albums